Barış Sulu is a Turkish politician from the Peoples' Democratic Party (HDP). Sulu is the first openly gay parliamentary candidate in Turkey.

But he wasn't elected to parliament. He has been an LGBT rights activist in Turkey since 1999. He is currently a refugee in Germany.

References

Peoples' Democratic Party (Turkey) politicians
Gay politicians
Turkish LGBT politicians
Turkish LGBT rights activists
Turkish gay men
People from Eskişehir
Year of birth missing (living people)
Place of birth missing (living people)
Living people